The Ministry of Foreign and European Affairs of the Republic of Croatia ( or MVEP) is the ministry in the Government of Croatia which is responsible for the country's foreign relations, its diplomatic missions and relations to international organisations, especially the European Union.

List of ministers

Foreign affairs ministers
The 15th and current minister is Gordan Grlić-Radman, in office since 22 July 2019. The longest serving minister was Mate Granić (1993–2000), under Prime Ministers Nikica Valentić and Zlatko Mateša, and the shortest serving was Davorin Rudolf who held the post for three months between May 1991 to July 1991 under Prime Minister Josip Manolić.

Political parties:

 (13)
 (1)
 (1)

Source: MVPEI.hr 
(*) Ministers of Foreign Affairs who held the post of Deputy Prime Minister of Croatia while in office.

European integration ministers
The Ministry for European Integration was a short-lived ministry which was established during Prime Minister Ivica Račan in 2000. It grew out of the Government Office for European Integration and was later merged with the Ministry for Foreign Affairs in 2005 under Prime Minister Ivo Sanader. The ministry was charged with overseeing the changes to the legislation needed to comply with the community acquis in preparation and during the Accession of Croatia to the European Union.

Political parties:

 (2)
 (1)
 (1)

(*) Ministers for European Integration who held the post of Deputy Prime Minister of Croatia while in office.

Notes
 a.  Unofficial minister. Mintas-Hodak was head of the Government Office for European Integration established in 1998.
b.  Jakovčić was appointed first head of the newly formed Ministry for European Integration in 2000 in the Cabinet of Ivica Račan I. The ministry was created out of the former Government Office for European Integration.
c.  Grabar-Kitarović was appointed European integration minister in 2003 in the Cabinet of Ivo Sanader I. On 16 February 2005 the Ministry for European Integration was merged with the Ministry for Foreign Affairs and Grabar-Kitarović took over as head of the merged ministry.
d.  Pusić was appointed to the post of Minister of Foreign and European Affairs, as the ministry was renamed in 2011 in the Cabinet of Zoran Milanović.

See also
Foreign relations of Croatia
List of diplomatic missions of Croatia

References

External links
Official website

Foreign affairs
Croatia
Foreign relations of Croatia
Donji grad, Zagreb